John Buckler may refer to:
 John Buckler (artist), British artist and occasional architect
 John Chessell Buckler, his son, British architect
 John Buckler (actor), British actor